La Villa: Live in Paris is a live album by saxophonist Teddy Edwards which was recorded in Paris in 1993 and released on the French Verve/Gitanes label the following year.

Track listing 
All compositions by Teddy Edwards except where noted
 "Juuls Delight" – 6:46
 "Lee-Ann" – 6:25
 "Lover Man (Oh, Where Can You Be?)" (Jimmy Davis, Ram Ramirez, James Sherman) – 7:18
 "What'cha Gonna Do" – 3:06
 "Madly in Love with You" – 3:59
 "French Basstry" – 7:36
 "If We Ever Said Good-Bye" – 5:59
 "Get Up and Get It" – 5:18
 "At the La Villa" – 7:28
 "April Love" – 4:13
 "L.A. After Dark/Good Gravy" – 13:30

Personnel 
Teddy Edwards – tenor saxophone, arranger
Alain Jean-Marie – piano
Thomas Bramerie – bass
Alvester Garnett – drums
Christian Escoudé – guitar (tracks 1, 2, 6–9 & 11)
Spanky Wilson – vocals (tracks 4, 5, 9 & 10)
String section conducted by Maurice Cevrero (tracks 2, 4, 5, 7 & 10)
Frédéric Laroque – concertmaster
Carole Saint Michel, Guillaume Fontanarosa, Jean-Claude Tcheurekdjian, Karen Strugg, Laurence Dupuis, Maxime Tholance, Patrice Mondon, Yves Melon – violin
Frédéric Gondot, Laurent Puchar, Ludovic Michel – viola 
Jean-Luc Bourré, Laurent Cirade, Raphaël Pidoux – cello

References 

1994 live albums
Teddy Edwards live albums
Verve Records live albums